A Grand Night for Singing is a musical revue showcasing the music of Richard Rodgers and the lyrics of Oscar Hammerstein II.

Featuring songs from such lesser-known works as Allegro, Me and Juliet, State Fair, and Pipe Dream, modest successes like Flower Drum Song and hits like Carousel, Oklahoma!, The King and I, South Pacific, Cinderella and The Sound of Music, it originally was presented cabaret-style at Rainbow & Stars at the top of Rockefeller Center.

After 41 previews, the Broadway production, directed by Walter Bobbie (who wrote the minimal book linking the tunes) and choreographed by Pamela Sousa, with vocal arrangements by Fred Wells and orchestrations by Michael Gibson and Jonathan Tunick, opened on November 17, 1993, at the Criterion Center Stage Right, where it ran for 52 performances. Victoria Clark, Jason Graae, Alyson Reed, Martin Vidnovic, and Lynne Wintersteller comprised the cast. Martin Vidnovic is replaced by Gregg Edelman in the cast recording, and some later performances.

It was nominated for two Tony Awards, for Best Musical and Best Book of a Musical, and the Drama Desk Award for Outstanding Revue.

An original cast recording was released by Varèse Sarabande.

Song list

Act I      
"Carousel Waltz" (from Carousel)
"So Far" (from Allegro)
"It's a Grand Night for Singing" (from State Fair)
"The Surrey with the Fringe on Top" (from Oklahoma!)
"Stepsisters' Lament" (from Cinderella)
"We Kiss in a Shadow" (from The King and I)
"Hello, Young Lovers" (from The King and I)
"A Wonderful Guy" (from South Pacific)
"I Cain't Say No" (from Oklahoma!)
"Maria" (from The Sound of Music)
"Do I Love You Because You're Beautiful?" (from Cinderella)
"Honey Bun" (from South Pacific")
"The Gentleman is a Dope" (from Allegro)
"Don't Marry Me" (from Flower Drum Song)
"I'm Gonna Wash That Man Right Outa My Hair" (from South Pacific)
"If I Loved You" (from Carousel)
"Shall We Dance?" (from The King and I)
"That's The Way It Happens" (from Me and Juliet)
"All at Once You Love Her" (from Pipe Dream)
"Some Enchanted Evening" (from South Pacific)

Act II      
"Oh, What a Beautiful Mornin'" (from Oklahoma!)
"Wish Them Well" (from Allegro)
"The Man I Used to Be" (from Pipe Dream)
"It Might as Well Be Spring" (from State Fair)
"When the Children Are Asleep" (from Carousel)
"I Know It Can Happen Again" (from Allegro)
"My Little Girl" (from Carousel)
"It's Me" (from Me and Juliet)
"Love, Look Away" (from Flower Drum Song)
"When You're Driving Through the Moonlight" (from Cinderella)
"A Lovely Night" (from Cinderella)
"Something Wonderful" (from The King and I)
"This Nearly Was Mine" (from South Pacific)
"Impossible" (from Cinderella)
"I Have Dreamed" (from The King and I)

External links

1993 musicals
Broadway musicals
Revues
Musicals by Rodgers and Hammerstein